Wégimont Castle is a castle in the ancienne commune of Ayeneux, Soumagne, Liège Province, Wallonia, Belgium.

During World War II, under the name Heim Ardennen, it was one of Nazi Germany's SS operated Lebensborn maternity homes.

See also
List of castles in Belgium

Sources
 De Standaard, 29 Sept 2009: Hitlers kindercrèche in de Ardennen 

Castles in Belgium
Castles in Liège Province
Soumagne